Jiang Jiayin (born 26 January 1995) is a Chinese basketball player. She represented China at the 2018 FIBA 3x3 World Cup.

External links 

1995 births
Living people
Chinese women's basketball players
Small forwards
Basketball players from Jiangsu
Sportspeople from Nanjing
Jiangsu Phoenix players
Asian Games medalists in basketball
Basketball players at the 2018 Asian Games
Asian Games gold medalists for China
Medalists at the 2018 Asian Games